Streamcore is an information technology company specializing in quality of service (QoS), controlling/monitoring Unified Communications (VoIP, video), and application delivery management over the Wide area network (WAN). Their products enable "WAN 2.0 Assurance" and cloud applications.

In November 2012, Streamcore was acquired by ORSYP, a leading provider of IT Operations Management software and services. This acquisition enables ORSYP to address their customers critical challenges of optimizing delivery of IT services to end-user throughout the enterprise network in real-time as well as anticipating future demands. Headquartered in Boston, Hong Kong, and Paris, ORSYP has been regional offices in Germany, Italy, Singapore, United Arab Emirates, and the United Kingdom.

Streamcore's main client base consists of large enterprises, operators, and governmental agencies who seek to ensure the quality of strategic applications. Streamcore was founded in 2004 by Diaa Elyaacoubi.

Products 
 StreamGroomers: regulate the traffic exchanged between LAN and WAN networks. Traffic is monitored and controlled according to network, application, VoIP and video rules.
 StreamGroomer Managers: centralized management system, provides real time monitoring as well as a view of the WAN infrastructure and application performance.

References

External links 

Information technology companies of France